The Kaniadakis exponential distribution (or κ-exponential distribution) is a probability distribution arising from the maximization of the Kaniadakis entropy under appropriate constraints.  It is one example of a Kaniadakis distribution. The κ-exponential is a generalization of the exponential distribution in the same way that Kaniadakis entropy is a generalization of standard Boltzmann–Gibbs entropy or Shannon entropy. The κ-exponential distribution of Type I is a particular case of the κ-Gamma distribution, whilst the κ-exponential distribution of Type II is a particular case of the κ-Weibull distribution.

Type I

Probability density function

The Kaniadakis κ-exponential distribution of Type I is part of a class of statistical distributions emerging from the Kaniadakis κ-statistics which exhibit power-law tails. This distribution has the following probability density function:

The exponential distribution is recovered as

Cumulative distribution function
The cumulative distribution function of κ-exponential distribution of Type I is given by

The cumulative exponential distribution is recovered in the classical limit .

Properties

Moments, expectation value and variance 
The κ-exponential distribution of type I has moment of order  given by

where  is finite if .

The expectation is defined as:

and the variance is:

Kurtosis 
The kurtosis of the κ-exponential distribution of type I may be computed thought:

 
Thus, the kurtosis of the κ-exponential distribution of type I distribution is given by:orThe kurtosis of the ordinary exponential distribution is recovered in the limit .

Skewness 
The skewness of the κ-exponential distribution of type I may be computed thought:

 
Thus, the skewness of the κ-exponential distribution of type I distribution is given by:The kurtosis of the ordinary exponential distribution is recovered in the limit .

Type II

Probability density function

The Kaniadakis κ-exponential distribution of Type II also is part of a class of statistical distributions emerging from the Kaniadakis κ-statistics which exhibit power-law tails, but with different constraints.

The exponential distribution is recovered as

Cumulative distribution function
The cumulative distribution function of κ-exponential distribution of Type II is given by

The cumulative exponential distribution is recovered in the classical limit .

Properties

Moments, expectation value and variance 
The κ-exponential distribution  of type II has moment of order  given by

The expectation value and the variance are:

The mode is given by:

Kurtosis 
The kurtosis of the κ-exponential distribution of type II may be computed thought:

 

Thus, the kurtosis of the κ-exponential distribution of type II distribution is given by:

or

Skewness 
The skewness of the κ-exponential distribution of type II may be computed thought:

 
Thus, the skewness of the κ-exponential distribution of type II distribution is given by:orThe skewness of the ordinary exponential distribution is recovered in the limit .

Quantiles 

The quantiles are given by the following expressionwith , in which the median is the case :

Lorenz curve 
The Lorenz curve associated with the κ-exponential distribution of type II is given by:

The Gini coefficient is

Asymptotic behavior 
The κ-exponential distribution of type II behaves asymptotically as follows:

Applications
The κ-exponential distribution has been applied in several areas, such as:
 In geomechanics, for analyzing the properties of rock masses;
 In quantum theory, in physical analysis using Planck's radiation law;
 In inverse problems, the κ-exponential distribution has been used to formulate a robust approach;
In Network theory.

See also
 Giorgio Kaniadakis
 Kaniadakis statistics
 Kaniadakis distribution
 Kaniadakis κ-Gaussian distribution
 Kaniadakis κ-Gamma distribution
 Kaniadakis κ-Weibull distribution
 Kaniadakis κ-Logistic distribution
 Kaniadakis κ-Erlang distribution
 Exponential distribution

References

External links
Giorgio Kaniadakis Google Scholar page
Kaniadakis Statistics on arXiv.org

Probability distributions
Mathematical and quantitative methods (economics)
Continuous distributions
Exponentials
Exponential family distributions